Ivan Kraskovsky (Ivan Kraskouski, Іван Красковський), (24 June 1880, Dubichy Tsarkounyya – 1955, Bratislava) was a Ukrainian-Belarusian politician active in the Ukrainian Party of Socialists-Federalists and earlier in the Belarusian Socialist Assembly.

Kraskovsky was a student at Warsaw University. He was appointed to the All-Russian Union of Cities in 1916. Following the February Revolution of 1917 he was a gubernial commissioner of the Russian Provisional Government in the Ternopil region. Then in January 1918 he became a deputy minister of the Ukrainian National Republic (UNR) serving under Volodymyr Vynnychenko.  Under the Hetman government he was a member of the Council of the Ministry of Foreign Affairs, becoming the diplomatic representative of the UNR in Georgia and Kuban. While in Kyiv, Kraskovsky also served as an advisor to the diplomatic representation of the Belarusian Democratic Republic and as Belarus' official representative at negotiations with Soviet Russia.

In 1925 he moved to Belarus. Here he was appointed as a lecturer at the Belarusian State University. He also worked at the Institute of Belarusian Culture and as a member of the Presidium of the Gosplan of the Belarusian Soviet Socialist Republic.

In 1930 he was arrested by the OGPU within the Case of the Union of Liberation of Belarus. Having spent almost ten years in a deportation in Samara, he was eventually allowed to leave the USSR and settle with his daughter in Bratislava, Czechoslovakia.

References

1880 births
1955 deaths
Ukrainian socialists
Belarusian socialists
Belarusian expatriates in Ukraine
Ambassadors of Ukraine to Georgia (country)
Belarusian diplomats
History of Kuban